Central Kalimantan is a province of Indonesia. It is one of five provinces in Kalimantan, the Indonesian part of Borneo. Its provincial capital is Palangka Raya and in 2010 its population was over 2.2 million, while the 2015 Intermediate Census showed a rise to 2.49 million and the 2020 Census showed a total of 2.67 million; the official estimate as at mid 2021 was 2,702,200.

The population growth rate was almost 3.0% per annum between 1990 and 2000, one of the highest provincial growth rates in Indonesia during that time; in the subsequent decade to 2010 the average annual growth rate slowed markedly to around 1.8%, but it rose again in the decade beginning 2010. More than is the case in other province in the region, Central Kalimantan is populated by the Dayaks, the indigenous inhabitants of Borneo.

History 
Since the eighteenth century the central region of Kalimantan and its Dayak inhabitants were ruled by the Muslim Sultanate of Banjar. Following Indonesian independence after World War II, Dayak tribes demanded a province separate from South Kalimantan province.

In 1957 South Kalimantan was divided to provide the Dayak population with greater autonomy from the Muslim population in the province. The change was approved by the Indonesian Government on 23 May 1957 under Presidential Law No. 10 Year 1957, which declared Central Kalimantan the seventeenth province of Indonesia. President Sukarno appointed the Dayak-born national hero Tjilik Riwut as the first Governor and Palangkaraya the provincial capital.

Geography 
It is bordered by West Kalimantan and East Kalimantan provinces to the north, by the Java Sea to the south, by South Kalimantan and East Kalimantan provinces to the east, and by West Kalimantan province to west.

The Schwaner Mountains stretch from the north-east of the province to the south-west, 80% of which is covered in dense forest, peatland swamps, mangroves, rivers and traditional agriculture land. Highland areas in the north-east are remote and not easily accessible. Non-volcanic mounts are scattered in this area including Kengkabang, Samiajang, Liang Pahang and Ulu Gedang.

The centre of the province is covered with tropical forest, which produces rattan, resin and valuable timber such as Ulin and Meranti. The southern lowlands are dominated by peatland swamps that intersect with many rivers. Sabangau National Park is a protected peatland area internationally acknowledged as sanctuary for the endangered Orangutan. Recently the peat swamp forests have been damaged by the Mega Rice Project, which unsuccessfully sought to turn large areas into rice paddies.

The province's climate is wet weather equatorial zone with an eight-month rainy season, and 4 months of dry season. Rainfall or precipitation is 2,776—3,393 mm per year with an average of 145 rainy days annually.

Rivers 
Central Kalimantan has numerous rivers from the catchment areas to the north in the Schwaner Mountains, flowing to the Java Sea. The major rivers include:
 Barito River (900 km)
 Kapuas River (600 km)
 Kahayan River (600 km)
 Katingan River (600 km)
 Mentaya (Sampit) River (400 km)
 Seruyan River (350 km)
 Lamandau River (300 km)
 Arut River (250 km)
 Sabangau River (200 km)
 Kumai River (179 km)
 Jelai River (100 km)

Rivers are an important mode of transportation and a primary location for settlement. With relatively undeveloped infrastructure, the province's economy relies heavily on the rivers.

Administrative divisions 
Central Kalimantan Province, when separated from South Kalimantan in 1958, comprised five regencies (kabupaten) - South Barito, North Barito, Kapuas, West Kotawaringin and East Kotawaringin - and one city (kotamadya), the latter being Palangka Raya (the provincial capital). On 10 April 2002 an additional eight regencies were created by splitting existing regencies - East Barito from part of South Barito Regency, Murung Raya from part of North Barito Regency, Gunung Mas and Pulang Pisau from parts of Kapuas Regency, Lamandau and Sukamara from parts of West Kotawaringin Regency, and Katingan and Seruyan from parts of East Kotawaringin Regency. Thus the province now is administratively divided into thirteen regencies (each headed by a regent) and the single city. These are as follows:

In addition to the civil service, Central Kalimantan also recognises a traditional governing system led by traditional leaders known as Demang. The province is divided into 67 traditional law areas known as Kademangan, headed by Demang. The system is intended to culturally recognise and preserve the customs and heritage of the Dayak tribes.

Railroads 

A Russian company had been contracted to build railroads from Central Kalimantan to East Kalimantan for coal transportation, with an estimated cost of US$2.4 billion, that was expected to start in 2013 and be completed by 2017.

Demographics

Religion

Ethnic groups 
The three major Dayak tribes in Central Kalimantan are the Ngaju, Ot Danum and Dusun Ma'anyan Ot Siang. The three major tribes extended into several branches of prominent Dayak tribes in Central Kalimantan such as Lawangan, Taboyan, Dusun Siang, Boyan, Bantian, Dohoi and Kadori.

In addition to the indigenous Dayak tribes, there are also ethnic groups from other areas of Indonesia, including Malays, Javanese, Madurese, Batak, Toraja, Ambonese, Bugis, Palembang, Minang, Banjarese, Makassar, Papuan, Balinese, Acehnese and also Chinese.

See also 
Deforestation in Borneo
Fauna of Borneo
Heart of Borneo

References

External links 
  
 Official statistics for the province provided by Statistics Indonesia may be accessed (in Indonesian) at  BPS-Statistics of Kalimantan Tengah Province.

 
.
Provinces of Indonesia
States and territories established in 1957
1957 establishments in Indonesia